St Antony's Church, Kanjiracode is a Latin Catholic Church located in Kollam district in the Indian state of Kerala. The Parish Priest is Very Rev. Fr Tomy Kamans. The Assistant Parish priest is Rev. Fr. Lenin Darwin Leon.

History
St. Antony's Latin Catholic Forane Church, Kanjiracode is listed among the first churches of Quilon diocese and of Kerala. The church occupies three acres on the northern side of old ceramics road (Sir C.P. Road) in an area dominated by a fishing community.

St. Thomas Christians migrated arrived near Kundara in the ninth century. The parish was officially established in 1502. St Antony's was originally built and blessed in the name of St. Lucia by the administrator of Cochin diocese.

The foundation stone was laid on 27 October 1609 and the church was blessed on 30 April 1609. The church was reconstructed and named after St. Antony of Padua in 1633. After the diocese of Quilon was officially established, Kanjiracode remained under the jurisdiction of Cochin diocese under Padravado and remained there until 1893. In 1975 reconstruction was begun to accommodate more believers. The church was finally blessed on 26 January 1986 by the Bishop of Kollam, his Excellence Rt. Rev. Dr. Joseph G. Fernandez, in the presence of Rev. Fr. A. Solomen, Parish Priest and dedicated to the Papal visit of Pope John Paul II in Kerala.

Mission statement 
St. Antony's church provides spiritual healing and better education, health care and women empowerment through its allied organizations.

Festival 
Patron saint St. Antony of Padua is celebrated on the Sunday preceding Ash Wednesday. The feast starts with the unfurling of the flag on the prior Sunday. The unfurling is a colourful function with religious pageantry that is attended by thousands of devotees. Besides liturgical functions, a religious discourse is held at St. Antony's shrine in Mukkada, in the evenings. People of all religious faiths attend these functions. On Saturday the day before the festival a procession is taken from the Church along with colorful floats of saints. The procession proceeds to Perayam, the northern boundary of the Parish and touches the southern boundary at Elampalloor and Mukkada. The Procession is attended by thousands of devotees from across the Diocese and beyond.

On the feast day High mass is celebrated in the morning by a senior church functionary. This is followed by Snehavirunnu (agape), a community Lunch partaken by ten thousand and more devotees, distribution of clothing to the poor, etc. The closing ceremony is the lowering of the flag in the evening with a procession around the church. One important feature is the participation of non-Catholics in the celebrations.

Religious status 
Average church attendance numbers two thousand. Bible study groups, Charismatic movements, Little way association, Legion of Mary, Sodality, Franciscan 3rd order, Jesus youth movement and KCYM active. St. Antony's Novena is conducted Tuesday evenings.

Administration 
The Parish council consists of 25 members. The Parish Priest is the President of the council. The members are elected from the 8 Parish wards. A four-member finance committee is selected from the council. This four-member committee assists the Priest in other financial activities. B.C.C.:- 54 B.C.C. group are actively participating in all church activities.

Status of women and children 
Women of Kanjiracode Parish are independent and employed. Catechism classes are conducted by sisters of St. Margaret's Convent for children aged 5–17. A Bible festival is conducted every year and Parish children won prizes in Forane, Diocese and State level.

Services 
Financial assistance is offered to poor families for education and also to help with illness. Parishioners help solve family and neighborhood disputes.

Former pastors 
The names of the Parish Priests up to 1888 were not recorded.

Chapel and shrines

References

Roman Catholic churches in Kerala
Churches in Kollam district